IBM code page 932 (abbreviated as IBM-932 or ambiguously as CP932) is one of IBM's extensions of Shift JIS.  The coded character sets are JIS X 0201:1976, JIS X 0208:1983, IBM extensions and IBM extensions for IBM 1880 UDC. It is the combination of the single-byte Code page 897 and the double-byte Code page 301. Code page 301 is designed to encode the same repertoire as IBM Japanese DBCS-Host.

IBM-932 resembles IBM-943. One difference is that IBM-932 encodes the JIS X 0208:1983 characters but preserves the 1978 ordering, whereas IBM-943 uses the 1983 ordering (i.e. the character variant swaps made in JIS X 0208:1983). Another difference is that IBM-932 does not incorporate the NEC selected extensions, which IBM-943 includes for Microsoft compatibility.

IBM-942 includes the same double-byte codes as IBM-932 (those from Code page 301) but includes additional single-byte extensions. International Components for Unicode treats "ibm-932" and "ibm-942" as aliases for the same decoder.

IBM-932 contains 7-bit ISO 646 codes, and Japanese characters are indicated by the high bit of the first byte being set to 1. Some code points in this page require a second byte, so characters use either 8 or 16 bits for encoding.

Layout

See also
LMBCS-16
Code page 942
Code page 943

References

External links
IBM Code Page 932

932
Encodings of Japanese